William Elliston may refer to:
 William Elliston (academic), priest and vice-chancellor of the University of Cambridge
 William R. Elliston, American planter, slaveholder and politician
 William Rowley Elliston, British judge and politician